Tiarna Ernst (born 24 January 1988) is a former Australian rules footballer who played for the Western Bulldogs and Gold Coast in the AFL Women's competition.

Early life
Ernst was born on Thursday Island in the Torres Strait region of Queensland and spent the majority of her childhood in Bamaga in the Cape York Peninsula. She relocated with her family to Julatten prior to entering high school. She competed in athletics events as a youth and was only introduced to Australian rules football while attending James Cook University in Cairns when she was convinced to play in the local football league for the Manunda Hawks. Ernst was drafted by the Western Bulldogs with their 14th selection and 108th overall in the 2016 AFL Women's draft.

She is a medical doctor trained in obstetrics and gynaecology and is currently a fertility specialist for City Fertility.

AFLW career

She made her debut in the thirty-two point win against Fremantle at VU Whitten Oval in the opening round of the 2017 season. She played every match in her debut season to finish with seven games. In April 2019, Ernst joined expansion club Gold Coast.
Ernst announced her retirement in October 2020, stating that she was unable to successfully juggle both football and her medical career.

References

External links 

Dr Tiarna Ernst's medical website

1988 births
Living people
Western Bulldogs (AFLW) players
Australian rules footballers from Queensland
Victorian Women's Football League players
Gold Coast Football Club (AFLW) players
James Cook University alumni
21st-century Australian medical doctors
People from Far North Queensland
21st-century Australian women
Sportswomen from Queensland
Australian obstetricians